Tatishvili is a Georgian surname. Notable people with the surname include:

Anna Tatishvili (born 1990), Georgian-American tennis player
Nodiko Tatishvili (born 1986), Georgian singer
Tsisana Tatishvili (1939–2017), Georgian operatic soprano and educator

Georgian-language surnames